Leila Kenzle (born July 16, 1960) is an American therapist and former actress best known for her role as Fran Devanow on Mad About You.

Leila Kenzle was born in Patchogue, Long Island, New York, the daughter of Lee, an antiques dealer, and Kurt Kenzle, who worked in electrical supply sales. Before moving to Los Angeles to become an actress she worked as a hotel telephone operator.  Her big break came when she was cast as a stripper in the off-Broadway production of Tony n' Tina's Wedding.  Her TV credits include appearances on The Golden Girls, Diagnosis Murder, Thirtysomething and The Cosby Show.

Personal life

Kenzle has been married to Neil Monaco, a private acting coach, since 1994.  Her film credits include Other People's Money, White Oleander, and The Hot Chick. Her final role to date was in the 2003 movie Identity.

After Mad About You ended, she obtained a master's degree in clinical psychology and is a marriage and family therapist practicing in Los Angeles.

References

External links
 Leila Kenzle Official website
 

1960 births
American film actresses
American stage actresses
American television actresses
Living people
Actresses from New York (state)
People from Patchogue, New York
American women psychologists
Family therapists
21st-century American women
American clinical psychologists